Béhorléguy is a commune of the Pyrénées-Atlantiques department in southwestern France.

It is located in the former province of Lower Navarre.

See also
Communes of the Pyrénées-Atlantiques department

References

Communes of Pyrénées-Atlantiques
Lower Navarre
Pyrénées-Atlantiques communes articles needing translation from French Wikipedia